Euphorbia labatii is a rare endemic known only from a single locality in Antsiranana Province, Madagascar.

References

Endemic flora of Madagascar
labatii
Critically endangered plants